Mitius is a genus of crickets in the family Gryllidae and tribe Modicogryllini.  Species can be found in Asia.

Species 
Mitius includes the following species:
Mitius blennus (Saussure, 1877)
Mitius castaneus (Chopard, 1937)
Mitius enatus Gorochov, 1994
Mitius flavipes (Chopard, 1928) - type species (as Gryllus flavipes Chopard)
Mitius minor (Shiraki, 1911)
Mitius minutulus Yang & Yang, 1995
Mitius splendens (Shiraki, 1930)

References

External links
 

Ensifera genera
Gryllinae
Orthoptera of Asia